Mili Township is a township in Yuanjiang Hani, Yi and Dai Autonomous County, Yunnan, China.

Administrative division
As of 2016, the township is divided into one community and five villages: 
 Mili Community
 Haluo
 Daheipu
 Daxin
 Wana
 Gancha

History
It was formerly known as "Chongshan Township" before 1949.

Geography
The township sits at the southwestern Yuanjiang Hani, Yi and Dai Autonomous County. It shares a border with Mojiang Hani Autonomous County to the west, Yangjie Township to the east, Yinyuan Town to the south, and Manlai Town to the north.

There are three major rivers and streams in the township, namely the Wana River, Nanzhang Stream, Xiaomiao Stream, and Yangma River.

Economy
The region's economy is based on agriculture and animal husbandry. The main crops are rice, wheat, corn, and vegetable. Commercial crops include tobacco, sugarcane, rape, pear, persimmon, and walnut. The region abounds with iron, nickel, and serpentine.

Tourist attractions
The Wana Hot Spring is a popular attraction in the township.

Transportation
The National Highway G213 passes across the township north to south.

References

Bibliography

Divisions of Yuanjiang Hani, Yi and Dai Autonomous County